Aarni is an avant-garde metal band from Finland.

Aarni may also refer to:

 Aarni (given name), a masculine given name
 Mikko Aarni (born 1981), Finnish bandy player

See also

 Aarne, a surname
 Aarnie
 Arni (disambiguation)